Introduction is the second extended play by American metalcore band Confide, released in August 2006.

Background
This is the last album featuring founding vocalist, Josh Plesh and is also the only album to include drummer John Paul Penton who as well left the band after this release. 

Confide went on to recruit former members, lead vocalist, Ross Kenyon and drummer/singer Joel Piper by the recording for their follow-up release, Shout the Truth which features a metalcore sound rather than the deathcore style the band initially performed on their first two releases.

Track listing

Personnel
Josh Plesh – vocals
Jeffrey Helberg – guitar
Aaron Richard Van Zuthpen – guitar
William 'Billy' Pruden – bass
John Paul Penton – drums

References

2006 EPs
Confide (band) albums
Self-released EPs